Torres do Mondego is a civil parish in the municipality of Coimbra, Portugal. The population in 2011 was 2,402, in an area of 16.66 km2. It was established on 1 February 1934.

References 

Freguesias of Coimbra